Mowla Bakhsh Bazar (also Romanized as Mowlā Bakhsh Bāzār; also known as Mollābakhsh Bāzār) is a village in Polan Rural District, Polan District, Chabahar County, Sistan and Baluchestan Province, Iran. At the 2006 census, its population was 272, in 52 families.

References 

Populated places in Chabahar County